Ryōsuke Oguma (小熊凌祐, born August 11, 1990, in Moroyama, Saitama, Saitama Prefecture) is a Japanese former professional baseball pitcher who is currently a staff for Chunichi Dragons of the Nippon Professional Baseball. He has played in NPB for the Dragons.

Career

On May 6, 2011, Oguma made his NPB debut.

On December 2, 2020, he become a free agent.

On January 8, 2021, Oguma become a staff for Dragons.

References

External links

1990 births
Living people
Baseball people from Saitama Prefecture
Chunichi Dragons players
Japanese baseball players
Nippon Professional Baseball pitchers